On Narcissism is a 1914 essay by Sigmund Freud, the founder of psychoanalysis.

In the paper, Freud sums up his earlier discussions on the subject of narcissism and considers its place in sexual development. Furthermore, he looks at the deeper problems of the relation between the ego and external objects, drawing a new distinction between the 'ego-libido' and 'object-libido' He introduces the idea of the 'ego ideal', and the self-observing agency related to it. Freud also looks briefly at his controversies with Carl Jung and Alfred Adler; indeed one of his motives for writing this was probably to show that the concept of narcissism offers an alternative to Jung's non-sexual 'libido' and Adler's 'masculine protest'.

See also
Egosyntonic and egodystonic
History of narcissism
Narcissistic withdrawal

References

1914 non-fiction books
Books by Sigmund Freud
Works about narcissism